

Films

References

Films
LGBT
2004
2004-related lists